Chet Winters is a former running back in the National Football League. He played with the Green Bay Packers during the 1983 NFL season.

References

Players of American football from Chicago
Green Bay Packers players
American football running backs
Oklahoma Sooners football players
1960 births
Living people